The Weisman-Hirsch House is a historic home located in Marshall, Texas.

History
It is a two-and-a-half story frame structure home built with Queen Anne and Colonial Revival elements. The house was built in 1900 for Joe Weisman, a leader in the city's Jewish community. The house was recognized with a Texas Historical Marker in 1979 and listed on the National Register of Historic Places in 1983.

References 

National Register of Historic Places in Harrison County, Texas